Gordon Leslie Herries Davies (born Gordon Leslie Davies, 18 January 1932, Manchester – 22 February 2019, North Uist, Scotland) was a British and Irish geographer, specializing in geomorphology, and a historian of geography and geology. He was the president of the Geographical Society of Ireland from 1962 to 1964.

Biography
As a child at the beginning of WW II, he was evacuated to Blackpool, but returned to Manchester after a brief time. G. L. Davies matriculated in 1949 to read geography at the University of Manchester. There he graduated in 1953 with an M.A. with a thesis on geomorphology in North Wales. In October 1954 he joined the academic staff of Trinity College Dublin (TCD). In TCD's department of geography, he was from an Assistant Lecturer from 1954 to 1957, a Lecturer from 1957 to 1970, and an Associate Professor from 1970 to 1989, when he when retired with emeritus status. In 1967 he was elected to Fellowship of TCD. At TCD he received a second M.A. jure officii on the basis of his academic standing. On sabbatical leave in Oregon, he completed his first book, Earth in Decay (1969), which earned him a Ph.D. from TCD. The book deals with the history of British geomorphology before 1878.

In 1977 Gordon Leslie Davies changed his name to "Gordon Leslie Herries Davies" — "Herries" was his mother's surname before her marriage. The reason for the name change was that K. Gordon Davies (1923–1994) was appointed in 1977 to the Erasmus Smith Chair of Modern History at TCD.

In November 1980, Davies gave the Ramsbottom Lecture to the Society for the History of Natural History. The lecture entitled The Mapping of Natural Phenomena in 19th Century Ireland was expanded into his 1983 book Sheets of Many Colours.

At TCD he served as a College Tutor for a number of years and, later in his career, as Senior Proctor. He served as editor of the journal Irish Geography from 1968 to 1978 and edited the journal's supplementary volume celebrating its golden jubilee year of 1984. In retirement, Herries Davies expended considerable effort as one of the editors for ‘The Dictionary of Irish Biography.

Herries Davies wrote numerous articles published in learned journals and also wrote several important books. He was an excellent writer with a clear expository style. His book The earth in decay (1969) is a significant work in the history of geomorphology. Sheets of many colours (1983) describes Irish geological mapping. North from the Hook (1995) gives a history of the Geological Survey of Ireland. In his 1995 book, he emphasizes that collecting fossils was always a "high priority" for the Geological Survey of Ireland. Whatever is under the Earth'' (2007) tells the history of the Geological Society of London from 1807 to 2007. He published in 1978 an overview of research on Earth sciences published in 23 Irish serial publications from 1787 to 1977.

Herries Davies was elected in 1979 a member of the Royal Irish Academy. He was honoured with the Sue Tyler Friedman Medal of the Geological Society of London in 1996, the History of Geology Award of the Geological Society of America in 1997, and the Founder’s Medal of the Society for the History of Natural History in 2000.

Desmond Alfred Gillmor, an emeritus professor at TCD, gave, in a 2019 memorial tribute, a description of the geographical work of Herries Davies.

In 1956 he married Kathleen Mary Fryer in Chester. They had two sons.

Selected publications

Articles

Books

References

1932 births
2019 deaths
Alumni of the University of Manchester
Alumni of Trinity College Dublin
Fellows of Trinity College Dublin
Academics of Trinity College Dublin
British geographers
Historians of geography
Historians of science
20th-century geographers
21st-century geographers